Edward Allen (born 1948) is an American novelist and short story writer.

Life
Allen was born in New Haven, Connecticut, grew up in New York, graduated from Goddard College, and attended the Iowa Writers’ Workshop in 1972.

He graduated from Ohio University with an M.A. in 1986 and a Ph.D. in 1989.

He taught at Rhodes College in Memphis, the University of Central Oklahoma, Jagiellonian University in Krakow, Poland as a Senior Fulbright Fellow, San Jose State University, and the University of South Dakota.

His work has appeared in The New Yorker, Story magazine, Gentlemen’s Quarterly, and Southwest Review.

His novel, Mustang Sally, published in 1992, was purchased and made into a film called Easy Six. It was submitted to the 2003 Sundance Film Festival.

He lives in Vermillion, South Dakota where he is an English Professor.

Awards
 2002 Flannery O'Connor Award for Short Fiction
 1994-1995 Senior Fulbright Fellowship

Works

Novels

Non-fiction

Short stories

Poetry
 The Clean Place Ohio University, June 1989

Anthologies

References

1948 births
Writers from New Haven, Connecticut
20th-century American novelists
20th-century American male writers
Goddard College alumni
University of Iowa alumni
Ohio University alumni
Rhodes College faculty
University of Central Oklahoma faculty
Academic staff of Jagiellonian University
San Jose State University faculty
University of South Dakota faculty
Living people
American male novelists
American male short story writers
20th-century American short story writers
Novelists from Connecticut
Novelists from Tennessee
People from Vermillion, South Dakota